Harry Richard "Cy" Morgan (November 10, 1878 – June 28, 1962) was an American Major League Baseball pitcher with the St. Louis Browns, Boston Red Sox, Philadelphia Athletics and the Cincinnati Reds between 1903 and 1913. Morgan batted and threw right-handed. He was born in Pomeroy, Ohio

He helped the Athletics win the 1910 and 1911 World Series.  The 1912 Reach Guide credits him with helping carry the pitching burden for the 1911 team while stars Jack Coombs and Chief Bender were less effective than usual early in the season.

Notable career achievements 
 Led the American League in Hits Allowed per 9 Innings Pitched (6.26) in 1909. This is also an Athletics' single season record.
 Athletics' Career Leader in Hits Allowed per 9 Innings Pitched (6.86).
 Ranks 42nd on MLB Career ERA List (2.51).
 Ranks 25th on MLB Career Hits Allowed per 9 Innings Pitched List (7.35).

In 10 seasons he had a win–loss record of 78–78 in 210 Games, 172 Games Started, 107 Complete Games, 15 Shutouts, 29 Games Finished, 3 Saves,  Innings Pitched, 1,180 Hits Allowed, 586 Runs Allowed, 403 Earned Runs Allowed, 18 Home Runs Allowed, 578 Walks Allowed, 667 Strikeouts, 95 Hit Batsmen, 59 Wild Pitches, 5,497 Batters Faced, 5 Balks, and a 2.51 ERA.

He died in Wheeling, West Virginia on June 28, 1962, of coronary artery disease.

See also 
 List of Major League Baseball career hit batsmen leaders

References

External links

Boston Americans players
Boston Red Sox players
Cincinnati Reds players
Philadelphia Athletics players
St. Louis Browns players
Major League Baseball pitchers
People from Pomeroy, Ohio
Baseball players from Ohio
1878 births
1962 deaths
Fall River Indians players
Minneapolis Millers (baseball) players
Indianapolis Indians players
St. Paul Saints (AA) players
Kansas City Blues (baseball) players
Denver Bears players
New Orleans Pelicans (baseball) players
Dallas Giants players
Ilion Typewriters players